Claudio Lezcano López (died 29 August 1999) was a Paraguayan football forward who played for Paraguay in the 1958 FIFA World Cup. He also played for Club Olimpia.

References

External links
FIFA profile

Year of birth missing
1999 deaths
Paraguayan footballers
Paraguay international footballers
Association football forwards
Club Olimpia footballers
1958 FIFA World Cup players
S.D. Aucas footballers
Paraguayan expatriate footballers
Expatriate footballers in Colombia
Deportivo Pereira footballers
Unión Magdalena footballers